Kaj Kolah may refer to:
 Kaj Kolah, Khuzestan, Iran
 Kaj Kolah, Zanjan, Iran

See also
 Kaj (disambiguation)
 Kolah Kaj, Lorestan, Iran